The 2013–14 Davidson Wildcats men's basketball team represented Davidson College during the 2013–14 NCAA Division I men's basketball season. The Wildcats, led by 25th year head coach Bob McKillop, played their home games at the John M. Belk Arena and were members of the Southern Conference. They finished the season 20–13, 15–1 in SoCon play to win the SoCon regular season championship. They advanced to the semifinals of the SoCon tournament where they lost to Western Carolina. As a regular season conference champion who failed to win their conference tournament, they received an automatic bid to the National Invitation Tournament where they lost in the first round to Missouri.

This was their last season as a member of the SoCon as they announced that they would join the Atlantic 10 Conference, effective July 2014.

Roster

Schedule

|-
!colspan=9 style=| Exhibition

|-
!colspan=9 style=| Regular season

|-
!colspan=9 style=| SoCon tournament

|-
!colspan=9 style=| NIT

References

Davidson Wildcats men's basketball seasons
Davidson
Davidson
2013 in sports in North Carolina
2014 in sports in North Carolina